Cabinet of Kazimierz Marcinkiewicz was appointed on 31 October 2005 and passed the vote of confidence in parliament on 10 November 2005. It was supported by 272 votes with 187 votes against (no abstentions). This minority government was ruled by politicians of Law and Justice and some independents e.g. Zbigniew Religa.

The Cabinet

References 

Marcinkiewicz, Kazimierz
Cabinet of Kazimierz Marcinkiewicz
Cabinet of Kazimierz Marcinkiewicz
2005 establishments in Poland
2006 disestablishments in Poland
Cabinets established in 2005
Cabinets disestablished in 2006